Anthia binotata is a species of ground beetle in the subfamily Anthiinae. It was described by Perroud in 1846.

References

Anthiinae (beetle)
Beetles described in 1846